Ratu Julian Nasaroa Brown Toganivalu (1932 – 5 December 1977) was a Fijian chief, civil servant and politician. He was a member of the 
House of Representatives for three days in 1977.

Biography
Toganivalu was the son of George Toganivalu, a member of the Legislative Council. He enlisted in the Fijian Military Forces and at the age of 19 he became the first Fijian to attend the Royal Military Academy Sandhurst. He later worked as a civil servant and was seconded to Nauru, where he was appointed chief executive of the Local Government Council.

In 1968 Toganivalu resigned from the civil service to join the Indo-Fijian-dominated Federation Party, becoming its organising secretary. He subsequently became a member of its successor, the National Federation Party, Toganivalu was elected to the House of Representatives as a member of the Flower faction of the party in the September 1977 elections. He was proposed as Leader of the Opposition by K. C. Ramrakha, but Jai Ram Reddy was appointed instead. He died in December the same year only three days after being sworn into office.

References

1932 births
Fijian chiefs
Fijian soldiers
Graduates of the Royal Military College, Sandhurst
Fijian civil servants
Fijian expatriates in Nauru
Members of the House of Representatives (Fiji)
National Federation Party politicians
1977 deaths